Melanomma may refer to:

 Melanomma (fungus), a genus of fungi in the family Melanommataceae
 Melanomma (moth), a genus of moths in the family Erebidae

See also 
 Melanoma